Fishbourne is a village between Wootton and Ryde, on the Isle of Wight.

The name "Fishbourne" might mean "stream of fish" or "fish spring."

It is positioned on the eastern bank of Wootton Creek, and includes the terminal for the Wightlink car ferry from Portsmouth.

Fishbourne, together with the adjoining Kite Hill area, became a civil parish in 2006 and has a parish council. The parish includes the ruined Norman abbey (founded 1132) and the Benedictine monastery including Quarr Abbey (founded in the early 1900s).

The Royal Victoria Yacht Club and the 'Fishbourne Inn' are located near the ferry terminal.

Public transport is provided by Southern Vectis bus routes 4 and 9, which stop on the main road, and operate to East Cowes, Newport and Ryde.

Governance
Fishbourne is part of the electoral ward called Binstead and Fishbourne. This ward covers much of the Binstead district of Ryde parish and at the 2011 Census had a total population of 3,185.

References

External links

 Fishbourne - The Willis Fleming Historical Trust
 Fishbourne Parish Council

Villages on the Isle of Wight
Civil parishes in the Isle of Wight
Ports and harbours of the Isle of Wight